Mike Smith (born July 17, 1987) is an American former professional basketball player who played mostly in the Belgian League. He was an All-American college player at the East Tennessee State University (ETSU).

College career
Smith came to ETSU after a prolific career at Van-Far High school in Vandalia, Missouri.  He scored 2,627 points in his high school career.  As a freshman, Smith averaged 11 points per game and was named to the Atlantic Sun Conference All-Freshman team.  After productive seasons as a  sophomore and junior, Smith suffered a knee injury that limited his to only four games in what would have been his senior year.  He was granted a medical redshirt and came back for the 2010–11 season.

Smith experienced his best season as a senior.  He averaged 17.9 points and 6.8 rebounds per game and was named first team All-Conference and the Atlantic Sun Player of the Year.  At the conclusion of the season, he was also named an honorable mention All-American by the Associated Press.  For his ETSU career, Smith scored 1,783 points.

Professional career
Smith was not drafted in the 2011 NBA draft.  He instead signed with Eisbären Bremerhaven in Germany's Basketball Bundesliga.  He averaged 8.3 points per game in his first professional season and led the team in three point shooting percentage.  After being drafted by the Iowa Energy in the 2012 NBA Development League Draft, Smith missed the entire 2012–13 season with a wrist injury suffered in practice.  For the 2013–14 season he signed with Liège Basket in Belgium. Smith averaged 16.6 points and 5.1 rebounds per game in the BLB. For the 2014–15 season he signed with Belfius Mons-Hainaut.

Smith was forced to retire in August of 2019 after being diagnosed with a serious heart condition.

Statistics

Domestic leagues

Regular season

|}

References

External links
 Belgian League profile
 ETSU bio

1987 births
Living people
American expatriate basketball people in Belgium
American expatriate basketball people in Germany
American men's basketball players
Antwerp Giants players
Basketball players from Missouri
Belfius Mons-Hainaut players
Brussels Basketball players
East Tennessee State Buccaneers men's basketball players
Eisbären Bremerhaven players
Liège Basket players
People from Vandalia, Missouri
Shooting guards